The Mukas Port, is a seaport in Kolambugan, Lanao del Norte, Philippines. It is owned and managed by Daima Shipping Corporation.

Passenger Lines
 Ozamiz - Daima

References

Mukas Port
Buildings and structures in Lanao del Norte
Transportation in Mindanao